The 8 cm Feldkanone M. 17 was a dual-purpose field and mountain gun used by Austria-Hungary during World War I. Between the wars it was used by Austria, Czechoslovakia, Romania and Yugoslavia. Captured weapons were used by Nazi Germany under the designations 7.65 cm FK 17(ö) or (t) and 7.65 cm FK 303(j).

It was a conventional design, albeit with some unique characteristics. The carriage was mounted on a double-crank, curved axle which made it lower to the ground, reducing visibility and improving stability. The curved axle allowed the weapon to traverse without movement of the wheels, although traverse was still limited by the need to prevent the recoiling barrel from hitting the carriage. In addition the spade was pivot-mounted allowing the weapon to traverse without disturbing the spade. This movement of the carriage without moving the wheels or spade produced a very accurate weapon.

The cannoneers rode standing on steps in front of the shield rather than sitting in seats attached to the shield, as was normal for the period. It was pulled by three pairs of horses when attached to its limber. The carriage could be broken down into three loads (tandem hitch) for transport in rough terrain.

References

Bibliography
 Englemann, Joachim and Scheibert, Horst. Deutsche Artillerie 1934-1945: Eine Dokumentation in Text, Skizzen und Bildern: Ausrüstung, Gliderung, Ausbildung, Führung, Einsatz. Limburg/Lahn, Germany: C. A. Starke, 1974
 Gander, Terry and Chamberlain, Peter. Weapons of the Third Reich: An Encyclopedic Survey of All Small Arms, Artillery and Special Weapons of the German Land Forces 1939-1945. New York: Doubleday, 1979 

World War I guns
World War II field artillery
World War I artillery of Austria-Hungary
76 mm artillery